Enrique of Malacca, was a Malay member of the Magellan expedition that completed the first circumnavigation of the world in 1519–1522. He was acquired as a slave by the Portuguese explorer Ferdinand Magellan in 1511 at the age of 14 years, probably in the early stages of the capture of Malacca. Although Magellan's will calls him "a native of Malacca", Antonio Pigafetta states that he was a native of Sumatra, Indonesia. Magellan later took him to Europe, where he accompanied the circumnavigation expedition in 1519. According to some historians, it is possible that he could be the first person to circumnavigate the globe and return to his starting point, however, there is no record or source that confirms it.

When Magellan appeared before the Spanish king, he spoke of Enrique as "a slave that he had had in Malacca; because he was from those islands they called him Enrique de Malacca." Antonio Pigafetta, a participant who wrote the most comprehensive account of Magellan's voyage, called him "Henrique" (which was Hispanicised as Enrique in official Spanish documents) and also referred to him as a slave.

Magellan expedition
Enrique accompanied Magellan back to Europe and onwards on Magellan's search for a westward passage to the East Indies, and he served as an interpreter for the Spaniards. American historian Laurence Bergreen cites Magellan's claim to the Spanish court that his slave Enrique was a native of the Spice Islands. Magellan produced letters from a Portuguese acquaintance, Francisco Serrão, who located the Spice Islands so far to the east of Spain, that they lay in the area granted to Spain, rather than Portugal. This gave Spain an opportunity to claim the Spice Islands.

Ginés de Mafra explicitly states in his first hand account that Enrique was taken on the expedition primarily because of his ability to speak the Malay language: "He [Magellan] told his men that they were now in the land he had desired, and sent a man named Herédia, who was the ship's clerk, ashore with a Native they had taken, so they said, because he was known to speak Malay, the language spoken in the Malay Archipelago." The island in the Philippines where Enrique spoke and was understood by the natives was Mazaua, which Mafra locates somewhere near Mindanao.

After Magellan's death
Magellan had provided in his will that Enrique was to be freed upon his death. But after the battle, the remaining ships' masters refused this bequest.

The Genoese pilot of the Magellan expedition wrongly stated in his eye-witness account that the Spaniards had no interpreter when they returned to Cebu, because Enrique had died on Mactan along with Magellan during the Battle of Mactan in 1521. However, Enrique was very much alive on 1 May 1521, and attended a feast given by Rajah Humabon to the Spaniards. Antonio Pigafetta writes that the survivor João Serrão, who was pleading with the crew from the shore to save him from the Cebuano tribesmen, said that all those who went to the banquet were slain, except for Enrique. A discourse by Giovanni Battista Ramusio claims that Enrique warned the Chief of Subuth [sic] that the Spaniards were plotting to capture the king and that this led to the murder of Serrão and others at the banquet.

Possibility of the first circumnavigation
Enrique accompanied Magellan on all his voyages, including the voyage that circumnavigated the world between 1519 and 1521. On 1 May he left in Cebu, with the presumed intention to return to his home island, and there is nothing more said of Enrique in any document.

If he succeeded in returning to his home before July 1522, he would have been the first person to circumnavigate the world and return to his starting point.<ref>Penélope V. Flores, "Magellan’s Interpreter, Enrique, Was The First To Circumnavigate The World", Positively Filipino. Accessed 25 September 2018.</ref> According to Maximilianus Transylvanus and Antonio Pigafetta documents, Elcano and his sailors were the first to circumnavigate the globe. Enrique is only documented to have traveled with Magellan from Malacca to Cebu in two segments—from Malacca to Portugal in 1511 and from Spain to Cebu in 1519–1521. The distance between Cebu and Malacca is 2500 km (approximately 20 degrees of longitude), which is left to complete the circumnavigation. It is not known if he ever had a chance to complete it.

Ethnicity and identity
In his last will, Magellan describes Enrique as a mulatto and native of Malacca,  part of modern Malaysia today. Alternately, Pigafetta described him as coming from Sumatra in modern-day Indonesia, located just across the Strait of Malacca. Either way, Enrique is generally accepted to have been an ethnic Malay. However, it has been asserted by Filipino historian Carlos Quirino that Enrique was himself a Visayan Filipino, a Cebuano or native of Cebu in the Philippines, on the mistaken assumption that Enrique must have conversed with the Cebuanos in their Cebuano language instead of the Malay language as attested by primary sources (the Malay language was the lingua franca of the region).

In popular culture

 Fictional works 
In Malaysia, a character known as Panglima Awang, a name given by a historical novel author, Harun Aminurrashid in his same novel titled  which was written in 1957 and first published in 1958 by Pustaka Melayu (under brand: Buku Punggok) is based on Enrique. According to the author, he gave Enrique the Malay name Awang to match his presumed ethnicity, while the title Panglima refers to Enrique's wisdom, strength and activeness.

In Indonesia, a book title "" (The first circumnavigator was an Indonesian: Enrique of Moluccas), written by Helmy Yahya and Reinhard Tawas, edited by Imam Hidayah has released in 2014. Moreover, Yahya continued to write the novel about Enrique Maluku with the title of "Clavis Mundi" in 2022, together with his colleagues (Utama Prastha and Donna Widjajanto, as well as research by Reinhard Tawas)..

In 2021, the historical novel Enrique the Black by Singapore author Danny Jalil was published by Penguin Random House SEA. The book depicts a fictionalized account of Enrique as a Malay teenager who was taken by Ferdinand Magellan and forced into slavery, later playing a pivotal role as an interpreter on the journey to the Moluccas Spice Islands, where the inhabitants speak the Malay language.

 Depictions in popular culture 
Portrayed by Oscar Obligacion in the 1955 Filipino film Lapu-LapuPortrayed by Julio Diaz in the 2002 Filipino film Lapu-LapuPortrayed by Kidlat Tahimik in his 2010 Filipino short film Memories of Overdevelopment 1980–2010Portrayed by Kidlat Tahimik in his 2015 Filipino feature film Balikbayan #1: Memories of Overdevelopment Redux IIIPortrayed by Aryan Farhan in the 2017 Portuguese-Malaysian documentary film Henry of Malacca: A Malay and MagellanPortrayed by Jon Samaniego in the 2019 Spanish CG animated film Elcano & Magellan: The First Voyage Around the WorldPortrayed by Colin Ryan in the 2022 Spanish miniseries Boundless

See also
Lapulapu
List of slaves
Magellan's circumnavigation

 Note 

References

Publications

Blair, Emma Helen and Robertson, James Alexander, The Philippine Islands 1493-1898 (55 vols, Cleveland, 1901-1907); abbreviated BR in citations.
Jesús, Vicente Calibo de, Mazaua, Magellan's Lost Harbor (2004)
Fry, Stephen, The Book of General Ignorance (London, 2006)
Genoese Pilot, Navegaçam e vyagem que fez Fernando de Magalhães de Seuilha pera Maluco no anno de 1519 annos In: Collecção de noticias para a historia e geografia das nações ultramarinas, que vivem nos dominios Portuguezes, ou lhes sao visinhas (Lisbon, 1826) pp. 151–176

Mafra, Ginés de, Libro que trata del descubrimiento y principio del Estrecho que se llama de Magallanes (1543), critical edition by Antonio Blazquez and Delgado Aguilera (Madrid, 1920) pp. 179–212
Maximilian Transylvanus, De Moluccis insulis (1523) in: The First Voyage (Manila: Filipiniana Book Guild, 1969: pp. 103–130
Morison, Samuel Eliot, The European Discovery of America: The Southern Voyages 1492-1616 (New York, 1974)
Parr, Charles McKew, So Noble a Captain: The Life and Times of Ferdinand Magellan (New York, 1953)
Pigafetta, Antonio, Magellan’s Voyage (1524)
1524a. facsimile edition of Nancy-Libri-Phillipps-Beinecke-Yale codex, vol. II (New Haven, 1969)
1524b. Primo viaggio intorno al globo terracqueo, ossia ragguaglio della navigazione...fatta dal cavaliere Antonio Pigafetta...ora publicato per la prima volta, tratto da un codice MS. Della biblioteca Ambrosiana di Milano e corredato di note da Carlo Amoretti. Milan 1800.
1524c. Il primo viaggio intorno al globo di Antonio Pigafetta. In: Raccolta di Documenti e Studi Publicati dalla. Commissione Colombiana. Andrea da Mosto (ed. and tr.). Rome 1894.
1524d. Le premier tour du monde de Magellan. Léonce Peillard (ed. and transcription of Ms. fr. 5650). France 1991.
1524e. Magellan’s Voyage, 3 vols. James Alexander Robertson (ed. and tr. of Ambrosian). Cleveland 1906.
1524f. Magellan’s Voyage: A Narrative Account of the First Circumnavigation. R.A. Skelton (ed. and tr. of Yale ms.). New Haven 1969.
1524g. *of Ms. fr. 5650 and Ambrosian ms.). London 1874.
1523h. The Voyage of Magellan: The Journal of Antonio Pigafetta. Paula Spurlin Paige (tr. of Colínes edition). New Jersey 1969.
1524i. Il Primo Viaggio Intorno Al Mondo Con Il Trattato della Sfera. Facsimile edition of Ambrosian ms. Vicenza 1994.
1524j. The First Voyage Around the World (1519-1522). Theodore J. Cachey Jr. (ed. based on Robertson’s tr.) New York 1995.
1524k. Pigafetta: Relation du premier voyage autour du monde...Edition du texte français d’après les manuscripts de Paris et de Cheltenham. Jean Denucé (text transcribed from Ms. 5650, collating Mss. Ambrosiana, Nancy-Yale and 24224 in notes.) Antwerp 1923.
Quirino, Carlos, "The First Man Around the World Was a Filipino" In: Philippines Free Press, 28 December 1991. --"Pigafetta: The First Italian in the Philippines." In: Italians in the Philippines, Manila: 1980. -- "Enrique." In: Who's Who in the Philippines. Manila: Pp. 80–81.
Ramusio, Gian Battista, La Detta navigatione per messer Antonio Pigafetta Vicentino (1550) In: Delle navigationi e viaggi... (Venice) pp. 380–98
Torodash, Martín, 'Magellan Historiography' In: Hispanic American Historical Review, vol. LI (1970), pp. 313–335
Zweig, Stefan, Conqueror of the Seas: The Story of Magellan'' (New York, 1938)

External links
Yale University – Pigafetta, Journal of Magellans' Voyage
Notes on Pigafetta, Mazaua, Ginés de Mafra another seaman of Magellan
First circumnavigator
Spanish PDV Enrique de Malacca
Malayan words recorded by Antonio Pigafetta
Sugbo Sa Karaang Panahon, Cebu-Online.com
Radio Sejarah. Melayu: Enrike of Melaka – Was the First Man to Sail Around the World A Malay
Pacific Maritime History Mazaua: Magellans' Lost Harbour
Crawfurd's description of Malay archipelago

16th-century Malay people
Circumnavigators of the globe
Converts to Roman Catholicism from Islam
Interpreters
Magellan expedition
People of Spanish colonial Philippines
Portuguese slaves
16th-century slaves